Canadian French is the French language as it is spoken in Canada. It includes multiple varieties, the most prominent of which is Québécois (Quebec French). Formerly Canadian French referred solely to Quebec French and the closely related varieties of Ontario (Franco-Ontarian) and Western Canada—in contrast with Acadian French, which is spoken by Acadians in New Brunswick (including the Chiac dialect) and some areas of Nova Scotia (including the dialect St. Marys Bay French), Prince Edward Island and Newfoundland & Labrador (where Newfoundland French is also spoken).

In 2011, the total number of native French speakers in Canada was around 7.3 million (22% of the entire population), while another 2 million spoke it as a second language. At the federal level, it has official status alongside Canadian English. At the provincial level, French is the sole official language of Quebec as well as one of two official languages of New Brunswick and jointly official (derived from its federal legal status) in Nunavut, Yukon and the Northwest Territories. Government services are offered in French at select localities in Manitoba, Ontario (through the French Language Services Act) and, to a lesser extent, elsewhere in the country, depending largely on the proximity to Quebec and/or French Canadian influence on any given region. In New Brunswick, all government services must be available in both official languages.

Dialects and varieties
Quebec French is spoken in Quebec. Closely related varieties are spoken by Francophone communities in Ontario, Western Canada and the New England region of the United States, differing only from Quebec French primarily by their greater conservatism. The term Laurentian French has limited applications as a collective label for all these varieties, and Quebec French has also been used for the entire dialect group. The overwhelming majority of francophone Canadians speak this dialect.

Acadian French is spoken by over 350,000 Acadians in parts of the Maritime Provinces, Newfoundland, the Magdalen Islands, the Lower North Shore and the Gaspé Peninsula. St. Marys Bay French is a variety of Acadian French spoken in Nova Scotia.

Métis French is spoken in Manitoba and Western Canada by the Métis, descendants of First Nations mothers and voyageur fathers during the fur trade. Many Métis spoke Cree in addition to French, and over the years they developed a unique mixed language called Michif by combining Métis French nouns, numerals, articles and adjectives with Cree verbs, demonstratives, postpositions, interrogatives and pronouns. Both the Michif language and the Métis dialect of French are severely endangered.

Newfoundland French is spoken by a small population on the Port au Port Peninsula of Newfoundland. It is endangered—both Quebec French and Acadian French are now more widely spoken among Newfoundland Francophones than the distinctive peninsular dialect.

Brayon French is spoken in Madawaska County, New Brunswick, and, to a lesser extent, Aroostook County, Maine, and Beauce of Quebec. Although superficially a phonological descendant of Acadian French, analysis reveals it is morphosyntactically identical to Quebec French. It is believed to have resulted from a localized levelling of contact dialects between Québécois and Acadian settlers.

Sub-varieties
There are two main sub-varieties of Canadian French. Joual is an informal variety of French spoken in working-class neighbourhoods in Quebec. Chiac is a blending of Acadian French syntax and vocabulary, with numerous lexical borrowings from English.

Historical usage
The term "Canadian French" was formerly used to refer specifically to Quebec French and the closely related varieties of Ontario and Western Canada descended from it. This is presumably because Canada and Acadia were distinct parts of New France, and also of British North America, until 1867. The term is no longer usually deemed to exclude Acadian French.

Phylogenetically, Quebec French, Métis French and Brayon French are representatives of koiné French in the Americas whereas Acadian French, Cajun French, and Newfoundland French are derivatives of non-koiné local dialects in France.

Use of anglicisms

The term anglicism is related to the linguistic concepts of loanwords, barbarism, diglossia, and the macaronic mixture of the French (français) and English (anglais) languages.

According to some, French spoken in Canada includes many anglicisms. The "" (Language Troubleshooting Database) by the Office québécois de la langue française distinguishes between different kinds of anglicisms:
 Complete anglicisms are words or groups of loan words from the English language. The form is often exactly the same as in English (e.g., "glamour", "short", and "sweet"), but sometimes there is a slight adjustment to the French language (e.g., "", which comes from the English word "drab").
 Hybrid anglicisms are new words, formed by the addition of a French element to an English word. This element (a suffix, for instance) sometimes replaces a similar element of the English word. "" is an example of hybrid anglicism; it is made up of the English verb "to boost", to which the French suffix –er is added.
 Semantic anglicisms are French words used in a sense which exists in English but not in French.
 Syntactic anglicisms are those relating to the word order of a sentence and the use of prepositions and conjunctions. The expression "" ("a good ten minutes"), for instance, comes from the English language; the more conventional French wording would be "".
 Morphological anglicisms are literal translations (or ) of the English forms. With these kinds of loan words, every element comes from the French language, but what results from it as a whole reproduces, completely or partly, the image transmitted in English. The word , for instance, is formed under English influence and does not exist in standard French (which would instead use the phrasing "").
 Finally, sentencial anglicisms are loan idioms peculiar to the English language.

Academic, colloquial, and pejorative terms are used in Canada to refer to the vernacular.

See also

 Official bilingualism in Canada
 French language in Canada
 Association québécoise de linguistique
 History of French
 Languages of Canada
 Quebec French lexicon
 French language in the United States
 CSA keyboard – the official keyboard layout of Canada
Canadian Language Museum
Maillardville
French colonization of the Americas

Notes and references

Notes

References
The lexical basis of grammatical borrowing: a Prince Edward Island French
Language in Canada. Edwards, John R.

Further reading
 Darnell, Regna, ed. (1971). Linguistic Diversity in Canadian Society, in Sociolinguistics Series, 1. Edmonton, Alta.: Linguistic Research. Without ISBN or SBN

External links

 Audio example of Canadian French

 
French language
French dialects
French language in Canada
French